Čestereg is a village in Serbia. It is situated in the Žitište municipality, Central Banat District, Vojvodina province. The village has a Serb ethnic majority and its population numbering 1,391 people (2002 census).

Name

In Serbian, the village is known as Честерег or Čestereg, in Hungarian as Csősztelek, in German as Tschesterek or Neuhatzfeld, and in Croatian as Čestereg.

History

The village was first mentioned in 1332 as Cherezek. During the Ottoman invasion it was devastated. In the 19th century, the area of present-day village belonged to Count József Csekonics (a Hungarian of Croatian descent). The modern village was founded in 1828. Its first inhabitants were Hungarians, but since they left from the village, Csekonics settled Germans in 1829. In 1900, the population of the village was composed of 2,001 Germans, 673 Hungarians, and 64 Romanians. After World War II, as a consequence of the war events, German population fled from the village and was replaced with Serb settlers from Herzegovina and Montenegro.

Ethnic groups (2002 census)

Serbs = 1,294 (93.03%)
Romani = 27 (1.94%)
Croats = 15 (1.08%)
Yugoslavs = 14 (1.01%)
Hungarians = 11 (0.79%)
others.

Historical population

1836: 1,213
1900: 2,767 
1961: 2,101
1971: 1,766
1981: 1,581
1991: 1,465
2002: 1,391

See also
List of places in Serbia
List of cities, towns and villages in Vojvodina

References

Slobodan Ćurčić, Broj stanovnika Vojvodine, Novi Sad, 1996.
Borislav Jankulov, Pregled kolonizacije Vojvodine u XVIII i XIX veku, Novi Sad - Pančevo, 2003.

Pictures Gallery

External links 

Populated places in Serbian Banat